Niklas Willén (born March 30, 1961) is a Swedish conductor. He was born in Stockholm and studied conducting and composition there at the Royal College of Music. His conducting teachers were Professors Jorma Panula and Kjell Ingebretsen, while his composition tutors were Ingvar Karkoff and Daniel Börtz.

Niklas Willén has served as Principal Guest Conductor of the Royal Stockholm Philharmonic Orchestra, Chief Conductor of the Nordic Chamber Orchestra in Sweden and the South Jutland Symphony Orchestra in Denmark. He has also been Generalmusikdirektor (GMD) of the Volkstheater Rostock and the Norddeutsche Philharmonie Rostock. He is currently Chief Conductor of the WDR Rundfunkorchester Köln in Cologne. Willén works with major orchestras and opera houses in Scandinavia, the rest of Europe and the USA. He has recorded for a number of labels including Naxos, BIS and Hyperion.
He has 4 children, Linnea, Julius, Hugo and Ossian.

External links
 Niklas Willén  bio on the Naxos site
 Niklas Willén bio on the Hyperion site
 Niklas Willén - conductor

1961 births
Living people
Swedish conductors (music)
Male conductors (music)
Royal College of Music, Stockholm alumni
21st-century conductors (music)
21st-century Swedish male musicians